Cyclen (1,4,7,10-tetraazacyclododecane) is a aza-crown ether with the formula (CH2CH2NH)4. It is a white solid.

Synthesis 
Some syntheses exploit the Thorpe-Ingold effect to facilitate ring-formation.  Illustrative is the reaction of the deprotonated tosylamides with ditosylates:
TsN(CH2CH2NTsNa)2  +  TsN(CH2CH2OTs)2   →  (TsNCH2CH2)4
The resulting macrocycle can be deprotected with strong acid.  Base gives the tetramine.  

High dilution conditions result in a low reaction rate penalty and this disadvantage is removed in an alternative procedure starting from triethylenetetraamine and dithiooxamide to a bisamidine – also a bis(imidazoline) – followed by reduction and ring expansion with DIBAL.

In one study  cyclen is covalently bonded  through a propylene molecular spacer to adenine and chelated with zinc diperchlorate. This complex is able to selectively bind uracil and uridine in a 1:2 ratio both through the adenine part and cyclen part of the molecule as evidenced by mass spectrometry.

See also
 Cyclam

References

Further reading
 

Ethyleneamines
Macrocycles
Chelating agents
Nitrogen heterocycles
Secondary amines